John Barry Nusum (born March 18, 1981 in Mineola, New York) is an American-born Bermudian retired football player.

Career

College
Nusum grew up in Devonshire, Bermuda, before returning to the United States to play college soccer at Furman University. At Furman he was named a NSCAA All-American three times. He is also currently the school's all-time leader in goals scored (61) and points (161).

Professional
After graduating from Furman, Nusum was selected 35th overall in the 2002 MLS SuperDraft by the Columbus Crew. Unsuccessful in making the Crew, he instead spent two seasons with the A-League's Atlanta Silverbacks, scoring ten goals with three assists in 44 games, before joining the Toronto Lynx for the 2004 A-League season, finishing with 4 goals in 25 games.  Nusum also has extensive professional indoor soccer experience, having played with the Philadelphia KiXX since 2004.  He was the 2005 MISL Rookie of the Year.  In 2007, the KiXX MISL championship.  In 2005 and 2006, he played for the Virginia Beach Mariners.  In 2008, he was with the Bermuda Hogges.  On March 2, 2009, he signed with Crystal Palace Baltimore.

He returned to Bermuda to become player/manager at Wolves, only to be replaced by Don Vickers for him to concentrate on playing.

International
Nusum was a mainstay in, and captain of, the Bermudian national team, leading the team in goals during the 2006 World Cup Qualifying round. He scored two goals to lead Bermuda to a 2-1 win at Trinidad and Tobago in the second round of 2010 World Cup qualifying. He quit the national team in 2013 and is Bermuda's record international goalscorer.

Managerial
He was named assistant coach at the national team set-up in December 2014, while still playing for Robin Hood.

Career statistics
(correct as of September 29, 2009)

Personal life
John is the nephew of former Bermudian international goalkeeper and New York Cosmos star Sam Nusum and the son of John Nusum. Nusum is a teacher at Saltus Grammar School, Bermuda, where he teaches the subjects of Physical Education and Sociology.

References

External links

Players inducted into Hall of Fame

1981 births
Living people
People from Devonshire Parish
Association football forwards
Bermudian footballers
Bermuda international footballers
Furman Paladins men's soccer players
Columbus Crew draft picks
Atlanta Silverbacks players
Toronto Lynx players
Virginia Beach Mariners players
Philadelphia KiXX players
Bermuda Hogges F.C. players
Bermudian expatriate footballers
Expatriate soccer players in Canada
Expatriate soccer players in the United States
Bermudian expatriate sportspeople in Canada
Bermudian expatriate sportspeople in the United States
Indoor soccer players
Major Indoor Soccer League (2001–2008) players
USL First Division players
USL League Two players
USL Second Division players
A-League (1995–2004) players
Bermudian football managers
All-American men's college soccer players